"Big Wheels in the Moonlight" is a song co-written and recorded by American country music artist Dan Seals.  It was released in September 1988 as the second single from Seals' album Rage On.  It peaked at number one, his ninth to do so.  The song was written by Seals and Bob McDill.

Content
The song—one of many in country music to pay salute to the American truck driver—is about a young man's childhood memories of watching semitrailer trucks travel along a nearby highway, listening at night to the roar of the trucks' diesel engines in the distance and dreaming one day of being a truck driver. The dream never comes to pass, as he begins a family and is working at other jobs, but still finds peace in envisioning the trucks in his mind, the trucks illuminated only by their lights and the moonlight of a clear evening.

Music video
The music video was directed by Neil Abramson, and was one of three videos filmed specially for Seals' 1991 video compilation, A Portrait.

Chart positions

Year-end charts

References

1988 singles
Dan Seals songs
Songs written by Bob McDill
Songs written by Dan Seals
Song recordings produced by Kyle Lehning
Capitol Records Nashville singles
1988 songs
Songs about truck driving